Nonnberg Abbey is a Benedictine monastery in Salzburg, Austria. Founded  by Saint Rupert of Salzburg, it is the oldest continuously existing nunnery in the German-speaking world. The monastery complex is today a protected monument and part of the Historic Centre of the City of Salzburg, a UNESCO World Heritage Site since 1996.

History

The convent was established beneath the Festungsberg hill and the ruined fortifications of the former Roman city of Juvavum. Its first abbess was Saint Erentrudis of Salzburg, who was either a niece or a sister of Bishop Rupert. The abbey's endowment was provided by the Agilolfing duke Theodo of Bavaria and his successor Theodbert. 

The nuns, all of noble birth, held extended estates up the Salzach river in the south of the city. The convent's possessions were later augmented by Emperor Henry II, who was also Duke of Bavaria. The Benedictine rule was finally implemented under Archbishop Conrad I of Salzburg in the early 12th century.

The abbey became independent of the founding house from 987. After a blaze about 1006, the abbey church was re-built with the support of Henry II; he and his consort Cunigunde of Luxembourg attended the consecration in 1009. This Romanesque building was again largely destroyed in a fire of 1423. Reconstruction took place between 1464 and 1509. In 1624 the church was enlarged by the addition of three side chapels. A refurbishment in the Baroque style took place in the 1880s.

Commemorative coin

The Abbey was selected as main motif for the Austrian Nonnberg Abbey commemorative coin minted on April 5, 2006. This was the first coin of the series "Great Abbeys of Austria". It shows the Benedictine convent of Nonnberg Abbey. On the hilltop in the background, Hohensalzburg Fortress and the Kajetaner church can be seen. The abbey and fortress are connected by the Reisszug, one of the world's oldest extant railways.

In popular culture
Through Maria Augusta Kutschera, later Maria Augusta von Trapp, who became a postulant in the abbey in 1924 and whose life was the basis for the Broadway musical (1959) and film (1965) The Sound of Music, the abbey has acquired international fame. The Mother Abbess during Maria's time at Nonnberg was Sister Virgilia Lütz (1869-1949). Nonnberg Abbey is featured in movies depicting the life of Maria Augusta Kutschera, namely  The Sound of Music and Die Trapp-Familie.

Gallery

References
Citations

Bibliography

 Franz Esterl: Chronik des adeligen Benediktiner-Frauen-Stiftes Nonnberg in Salzburg, Salzburg, 1841 (at Google Books, in German)

External links
 www.nonnberg.at Official Website
 Nonnberg Abbey at Sacred Destinations
 Stift Nonnberg at Visit-Salzburg
 Historic Centre of the City of Salzburg at UNESCO

Benedictine monasteries in Austria
Christian monasteries established in the 8th century
Benedictine nunneries in Austria
Monasteries in Salzburg
Tourist attractions in Salzburg
Churches completed in 714
Establishments in the Prince-Archbishopric of Salzburg